Trampling  is a sexual activity that involves being trampled underfoot by another person or persons. Trampling is common enough to support a  subgenre of trampling pornography.

Because trampling can be used to produce pain, the trampling fetish for some adherents is closely linked to sadomasochistic fetishism.

A similar fetish is to imagine themselves as being tiny under another's feet, or being normal size, but being trampled by a giant person.  This is known as "giant/giantess fetishism" or macrophilia.  It is not the same as trampling.

The most common form of trampling is done by a female (mistress) walking on a male submissive and is usually done barefooted, in socks, nylons, or shoes. The trampler will predominantly walk, jump and stomp on the person's back and chest.

See also

Crush fetish
Foot fetishism
Shoe fetishism
Erotic asphyxiation
Breast fetishism
Buttocks fetishism

References

BDSM terminology
Foot fetishism